Tillinae is a subfamily of beetles in the family Cleridae, the checkered beetles.

Genera 

 Antenius Fairmaire, 1903
 Arachnoclerus Fairmaire, 1902
 Araeodontia Barr, 1952
 Archalius Fairmaire, 1903
 Aroterus Schenkling, 1906
 Basilewskyus Pic, 1950
 Biflabellotillus Pic, 1949
 Bilbotillus Kolibac, 1997
 Bogcia Barr, 1978
 Bostrichoclerus Van Dyke, 1938
 Callotillus Wolcott, 1911
 Ceratocopus Hintz, 1902
 Chilioclerus Solervicens, 1976
 Cladiscopallenis Pic, 1949
 Cladiscus Chevrolat, 1843
 Cladomorpha Pic, 1949
 Cteniopachys Fairmaire, 1889
 Cylidroctenus Kraatz, 1899
 Cylidrus Latreille, 1825
 Cymatodera Gray in Griffith, 1832
 Cymatoderella Barr, 1962
 Dedana Fairmaire, 1888
 Denops Fischer von Waldheim, 1829
 Diplocladus Fairmaire, 1885
 Diplopherusa Heller, 1921
 Eburneocladiscus Pic, 1955
 Egenocladiscus Corporaal & van der Wiel, 1949
 Elasmocylidrus Corporaal, 1939
 Enoploclerus Hintz, 1902
 Eucymatodera Schenkling, 1899
 Falsopallenis Pic, 1926
 Falsotillus Gerstmeier & Kuff, 1992
 Flabellotilloidea Gerstmeier & Kuff, 1992
 Gastrocentrum Gorham, 1876
 Gracilotillus Pic, 1933
 Impressopallenis Pic, 1953
 Isocymatodera Hintz, 1902
 Lecontella Wolcott & Chapin, 1918
 Leptoclerus Kraatz, 1899
 Liostylus Fairmaire, 1886
 Macroliostylus Pic, 1939
 Magnotillus Pic, 1936
 Melanoclerus Chapin, 1919
 Microtillus Pic, 1950
 Monophylla Spinola, 1841
 Neocallotillus Burke, 2016
 Nodepus Gorham, 1892
 Notocymatodera Schenkling, 1907
 Onychotillus Chapin, 1945
 Orthocladiscus Corporaal & van der Wiel, 1949
 Pallenis Laporte de Castelnau, 1836
 Paracladiscus Miyatake, 1965
 Paradoxocerus Kraatz, 1899
 Paraspinoza Corporaal, 1942
 Philocalus Klug, 1842
 Picoclerus Corporaal, 1936
 †Prospinoza (fossil)
 Pseudachlamys Duvivier, 1892
 Pseudogyponix Pic, 1939
 Pseudopallenis Kuwert, 1893
 Pseudoteloclerus Pic, 1932
 Rhopaloclerus Fairmaire, 1886
 Smudlotillus Kolibac, 1997
 Spinoza Lewis, 1892
 Stenocylidrus Spinola, 1844
 Strotocera Schenkling, 1902
 Synellapotillus Pic, 1939
 Synellapus Fairmaire, 1903
 Teloclerus Schenkling, 1903
 Tilloclerus White, 1849
 Tillodadiscus Pic, 1953
 Tillodenops Hintz, 1905
 Tilloidea Laporte de Castelnau, 1832
 Tillus Olivier, 1790
 Tylotosoma Hintz, 1902

References 

 Burke, A.F. & Zolnerowich, G. 2016. Taxonomic revision of the New World genus Callotillus Wolcott (Cleridae, Tillinae), with the description of the new genus Neocallotillus, and an illustrated key of identification to species. ZooKeys 617: 65–89, 
 Burke, A.F., Leavengood, J.M. Jr. & Zolnerowich, G. 2015. A checklist of the New World species of Tillinae (Coleoptera: Cleridae), with an illustrated key to genera and new country records. Zootaxa 4059(1): 1–39, 
 Gerstmeier, R.; Eberle, J. 2011: Definition and revision of the Orthrius-group of genera (Coleoptera, Cleridae, Clerinae). ZooKeys, 92: 35–60,

External links 
 
 

 
Beetle subfamilies